Acetomel is a syrup made from honey and vinegar, giving a sweet and sour taste. It was commonly used in the preservation of fruit, though it is very seldom used today. Certain fruits, when preserved thus, such as quinces, pears, and grapes, are called aceto-dolce, that is "sweet-and-sour fruit".

See also
 List of syrups

Notes

Syrup
Vinegar